Thomas Greene may refer to:
Sir Thomas Green (c. 1461–1506), grandfather of Katherine Parr, last wife of Henry VIII
Thomas Greene (governor) (1609–1651), Proprietary Governor of the colony of Maryland, 1647–1648/1649
Thomas Greene (bishop), Bishop of Ely, 1723–1738
Thomas Christopher Greene (born 1968), American novelist
Thomas M. Green Jr. (1758–1813), delegate to the United States Congress from Mississippi Territory
Thomas A. Greene (1827–1894), amateur geologist
Tom Greene (Florida politician) (born 1932), Florida state representative from 1963 to 1966, and state senator from 1966 to 1967
Thomas Greene (Iowa politician) (born 1949), American politician in the Iowa State Senate
Tom Greene (Louisiana politician) (born 1948), member of the Louisiana State Senate
Tom Greene (American football) (born 1938), American football quarterback and punter
Thomas Rea Greene (1904–1950), steamboat captain from Ohio
Thomas Greene (MP) (1790–1871), British Member of Parliament for Lancaster
Thomas McLernon Greene (1926–2003), American scholar of English literature
Thomas Garland Greene, Canadian painter
Fred Clifton (1844–1903),  stage name of English opera singer and actor Thomas Huslea Greene

See also
Tommy Greene (born 1967), former Major League Baseball pitcher
Thomas Green (disambiguation)
Tom Green (disambiguation)